Ahrens v. Clark, 335 U.S. 188 (1948), was a United States Supreme Court case that denied a federal district court jurisdiction to issue a writ of habeas corpus if the person detained is not within the territorial jurisdiction of the court when the petition is filed. The 6–3 ruling was handed down on June 21, 1948, with the majority opinion written by Justice William O. Douglas and the dissent written by Justice Wiley Blount Rutledge.

The decision was substantially overturned in Braden v. 30th Judicial Circuit Court of Kentucky (1973), which held that territorial jurisdiction is derived from the location of the custodian, those responsible for the indictment, rather than the location of the detention.

Overview
The United States District Court for the District of Columbia had been petitioned by 120 German detainees being held on Ellis Island for a writ of habeas corpus to challenge in court their detention and imminent deportation. The deportation order had been issued by Attorney General Tom C. Clark, using wartime powers granted by President Harry Truman in the waning months of World War II. The detainees argued that the US Court for DC had jurisdiction because they were being held "subject to the custody and control" of the Attorney General. The government argued that their case should be dismissed because Ellis Island is outside of the territorial confines of the District of Columbia. The Supreme Court, the federal appeals courts, and the federal district courts had the power to grant writs of habeas corpus "within their respective jurisdictions"; the case hinged on whether the words "within their respective jurisdictions" implied a territorial limitation. The court held that they did.

Opinion

Dissent
Judge Wiley Blount Rutledge was concerned that the Court's decision was narrowly construing the great writ of habeas corpus.

He wrote:

Significance
The case was newly significant in the 21st century because the question of territorial jurisdiction arose during the U.S. War on Terror following the 9/11 attacks. The United States detained hundreds of foreign captives at a US Navy facility in Guantanamo Bay, which it held was outside the territorial jurisdiction of all federal district courts. Detainees petitioned the federal courts for habeas corpus challenges of their detention, and some cases reached the US Supreme Court.

Justice John Paul Stevens had clerked for Justice Wiley Rutledge during the term Ahrens v. Clark was decided. He helped draft Justice Rutledge's dissenting opinion in the case and knew his reasoning. He also knew of Braden v. 30th Judicial Circuit Court (1973), in which the Supreme Court held:

Justice Stevens used his background from the cases when drafting the majority opinion in Rasul v. Bush (2004). The Court held that the US courts had jurisdiction in the US Circuit Court for the District of Columbia over the officers of the executive branch who were the policymakers and ultimate custodians of the detainees and the facility at Guantanamo.

See also
 Hamdan v. Rumsfeld (2006)
 Boumediene v. Bush (2008)
 List of United States Supreme Court cases, volume 335
 List of United States Supreme Court cases
 Lists of United States Supreme Court cases by volume
 List of United States Supreme Court cases by the Vinson Court

References

External links
 

United States Supreme Court cases
United States Supreme Court cases of the Vinson Court
1948 in United States case law
Overruled United States Supreme Court decisions
United States habeas corpus case law